Chandan Kumar Choudhary is an Indian politician. He is a member of the Bhartiya Janta Party. He won the Municipal Corporation of Delhi election on 7 December 2022 2022 Delhi Municipal Corporation election

References 

Living people
Year of birth missing (living people)
Indian politicians